German submarine U-51 was a Type VIIB U-boat of Nazi Germany's Kriegsmarine that operated during World War II. She was ordered on 21 November 1936 and laid down on 26 February 1937 in Kiel. She was launched on 11 June 1938 and commissioned on 6 August 1938.

She was a member of one wolfpack.

She was sunk on 20 August 1940 in the Bay of Biscay by a torpedo from a British submarine.

Design
German Type VIIB submarines were preceded by the shorter Type VIIA submarines. U-51 had a displacement of  when at the surface and  while submerged. She had two shafts and two  propellers.

U-51 was fitted with five  torpedo tubes (four fitted at the bow and one at the stern), fourteen torpedoes, one  SK C/35 naval gun, 220 rounds, and one  anti-aircraft gun The boat had a complement of between forty-four and sixty.

Service history
U-51 was ordered by the Kriegsmarine on 21 November 1936 (as part of Plan Z and in violation of the Treaty of Versailles). She was laid down on 15 September 1938 by Friedrich Krupp Germaniawerft AG, in Kiel as yard number 586. U-51 was launched on 11 June 1938 and commissioned on 6 August of that same year under the command of Kapitänleutnant (Kptlt.) Ernst-Günther Heinicke.

After being commissioned and deployed, U-51 was stationed in the German port of Kiel. This city was to be her home for the rest of her brief career.

During her service with the Kriegsmarine, she took part in four combat patrols. She joined the 7th U-boat Flotilla on 6 August 1938. She was to remain a part of this flotilla until her loss.

First patrol
The first of U-51s four patrols began on 17 January 1940 when she left Kiel and crossed the North Sea. Moving south down the west coast of Ireland, she encountered the Eika west of the Scilly Isles on the 29th and sent her to the bottom. After sailing between the Scottish islands once more, but in the opposite direction, the boat docked at Wilhelmshaven on 8 February after 23 days at sea.

Second patrol
The main incident of note on the submarine's second sortie was when the French submarine Orphée launched two torpedoes at her in the North Sea on 21 April 1940. They missed. The rest of the patrol was carried out parallel to the Norwegian coast.

Third patrol
For her third foray, the boat entered the Atlantic after passing between the Faroe and Shetland Islands. U-51 went on to sink the Q-ship  on the 29th. This ship, used as a decoy, was formidably armed with nine 4-inch guns and four torpedo tubes. Her ballast was given extra buoyancy which meant three 'eels' (U-boat slang for torpedoes), were needed to dispose of the vessel, which still took over an hour to sink.

Fourth patrol
The boat departed Kiel on 9 August 1940. There were 36 survivors, of which 20 were picked up by the Belgian trawler Rubens and landed at Fleetwood on the English west coast. The remainder were recovered by another trawler which was under British Admiralty control and named . Her human cargo was discharged at Tobermory, Isle of Mull.

Fate
U-51 was sunk by a torpedo from the British submarine  in the Bay of Biscay on 28 August 1940. Forty-three men died; there were no survivors.

Wolfpacks
U-51 took part in one wolfpack, namely:
 Prien (12 – 17 June 1940)

Summary of raiding history

In fiction
The fourth U-boat in the film The Navy Comes Through has the number U-51.

References

Notes

Citations

Bibliography

External links

German Type VIIB submarines
U-boats commissioned in 1938
World War II submarines of Germany
U-boats sunk by British submarines
1938 ships
U-boats sunk in 1940
World War II shipwrecks in the Atlantic Ocean
Ships built in Kiel
Ships lost with all hands
Maritime incidents in August 1940